Anders Liljeblad (born 16 November 1959) is a Swedish sailor. He competed in the men's 470 event at the 1988 Summer Olympics.

References

External links
 

1959 births
Living people
Swedish male sailors (sport)
Olympic sailors of Sweden
Sailors at the 1988 Summer Olympics – 470
People from Tranås Municipality
Sportspeople from Jönköping County